Kalachinsk is a town in Omsk Oblast, Russia, located on the Om River along the busiest segment of the Trans-Siberian Railway,  east of Omsk, the administrative center of the oblast. Population:

Administrative and municipal status
Within the framework of administrative divisions, Kalachinsk serves as the administrative center of Kalachinsky District, even though it is not a part of it. As an administrative division, it is incorporated separately as the town of oblast significance of Kalachinsk—an administrative unit with the status equal to that of the districts. As a municipal division, the town of oblast significance of Kalachinsk is incorporated within Kalachinsky Municipal District as Kalachinsk Urban Settlement.

Economy
In the Soviet days of restricted commerce, the town acquired local fame for its weekend market. Fueled by visitors from Kalachinsk arriving by elektrichkas (trains) to Omsk, the Omsk open-air flea markets thrived here.

There are two new agricultural plants built in the town.

References

Notes

Sources

External links

Official website of Kalachinsk 
Kalachinsk Business Directory 

Cities and towns in Omsk Oblast
Tyukalinsky Uyezd